Mictyris is a genus of brightly coloured crabs, placed in its own taxonomical family, the Mictyridae. It inhabits the central Indo-West Pacific region. These crabs congregate on mud flats or beaches in groups of a few thousand, and filter sand or mud for microscopic organisms. They congregate during low tide, and bury themselves in the sand during high tide or whenever they are threatened. This is done in wet sand, and they dig in a corkscrew pattern, leaving many small round pellets of sand behind them.

Species

The genus contains eight species: 

The predictable behaviour of these crabs has led them to be used in experiments in a form of billiard ball computer.

References

External links

Ocypodoidea

Crustaceans